Andrey Nikolayevich Sakharov (2 June 1930, – 26 June 2019)  was an anti-Normanist Russian historian.

Career 
Sakharov was born in Kulebaki. In 1993, he was appointed Director of the Russian History Institute, affiliated with the Academy of Sciences. He initiated a campaign to purge the institute of his Normanist opponents. It came under much criticism, forcing Sakharov into retirement in 2010.

Sakharov was an active member of the Presidential Commission of the Russian Federation to Counter Attempts to Falsify History to the Detriment of Russia's Interests that existed between 2009 and 2012.

Works 
His major monographs include The Diplomacy of Ancient Rus (1980) and its sequel, The Diplomacy of Svyatoslav (1982). For his studies of early medieval diplomacy Sakharov was elected a corresponding member of the Russian Academy of Sciences (1991).

References

External links 
Andrey  Sakharov at the RAS

20th-century Russian historians
Soviet historians
Moscow State University alumni
Corresponding Members of the Russian Academy of Sciences
1930 births
2019 deaths
Recipients of the Order of Friendship of Peoples
Recipients of the Order "For Merit to the Fatherland", 4th class
Russian medievalists
Soviet medievalists